Reva Appleby Gerstein  (born Reva Appleby; 27 March 1917 – 6 January 2020) was a Canadian psychologist, educator, and mental health advocate. She was the first woman Chancellor of the University of Western Ontario, serving from 1992 to 1996.

Biography 
Gerstein was the daughter of Diana (Kraus) and David Appleby. After attending Fern Avenue Public School and Parkdale Collegiate Institute, Gerstein earned a Bachelor of Arts degree (1938), a Master of Arts degree (1939), and a PhD (1945) from the University of Toronto.

Reva Appleby married Bertrand Gerstein on 5 June 1939 at Toronto's Holy Blossom Temple. The couple had two sons, Irving Russell (1941-) and Ira Michael (1947-). In the fall of 1979, she remarried to David Raitblat. She turned 100 in 2017.

Career 
Gerstein taught courses in psychology at the University of Toronto from 1942 to 1945, and later taught at York University. In 1945, she became National Director of Program Planning for the Canadian Mental Health Association, beginning what would become a decades-long career in mental health advocacy. Gerstein is credited with leading the shift in Canadian mental health care from a medical model to one focused on healthy, community-based living beyond psychiatric institutions.

In the 1980s, she chaired the Toronto Mayor's Action Task Force on Discharged Psychiatric Patients. As a result of the task force's recommendations, a number of community mental health services were established in Toronto, including the Gerstein Crisis Centre. Gerstein served as the founding chair of the board. Gerstein also helped establish the Hincks Treatment Centre for adolescents (now the SickKids Centre for Community Mental Health).

Gerstein died in January 2020 at the age of 102.

Honours
 In 1974, Gerstein was made a Member of the Order of Canada; she was promoted to the title of Officer in 1979, and to the title of Companion in 1997.
 In 1975 she was awarded an Honorary Doctor of Laws from the University of Guelph.
 In 1988, she was awarded the Order of Ontario. 
 She received honorary degrees from University of Western Ontario (1972), Lakehead University (1974), University of Guelph (1975), Queen's University (1981), York University (1993), and the University of Toronto (1996)
 She was a Fellow of the Canadian Psychological Association.

References

1917 births
2020 deaths
Canadian centenarians
Canadian psychologists
Canadian women psychologists
Chancellors of the University of Western Ontario
Companions of the Order of Canada
Jewish Canadian scientists
Members of the Order of Ontario
Scientists from Toronto
University of Toronto alumni
Academic staff of the University of Toronto
Women centenarians